Jiji people also known as Bajiji (Wajiji in Swahili) are a Bantu ethnic and linguistic group based in Kigoma Region, Tanzania.
If tribes are classified by language and not by race, Bajiji (Jiji people) are part of Baha (Ha people) since their language is the same. Traditionally they were organized into a separate kingdom, Bujiji (Swahili Ujiji, same as the Swahili town of Ujiji near Kigoma), and formed part of Buha (Uha, Ha territory) with other kingdoms: Heru, Bushingo (Ushingo), Ruguru (Luguru), Muhambwe and Buyungu, all of them in Kigoma Region, Tanzania. 
In the 18th and 19th century there was a sultanate that involved the Jiji and Manyema groups under Mwene Mbonwean Sultanate of Ujiji.

References

Ethnic groups in Tanzania
Indigenous peoples of East Africa